Sepopa is a village in North-West District of Botswana. It is located close to the beginning of the Okavango Delta. The population was 1,519 in 2001 census.

References

North-West District (Botswana)
Villages in Botswana